Zarichne is an urban-type settlement in Rivne Oblast (province) in western Ukraine. The town also formerly served as the administrative center of Zarichne Raion (district), housing the district's local administration buildings until the raion's abolition, and is now administered within Varash Raion. Its population is 6,854 as of the 2001 Ukrainian Census. Current population: 

The settlement was first founded on September 27, 1480, as Pohost Zarzeczny. In 1946, the settlement was renamed to its current "Zarichne." In 1959, the settlement acquired the status of an urban-type settlement in 1959.

References

Urban-type settlements in Varash Raion
Pinsky Uyezd
Polesie Voivodeship
Populated places established in the 1480s